Bodmin Airfield  is located  northeast of Bodmin, Cornwall, England, UK.

Radio equipped microlights can use Bodmin (radio contact preferred). All aircraft are strictly Prior Permission Required.

History 

Bodmin Airfield was the development of a dream by local business man, Mike Robertson, founder of Trago Mills, to make aviation available to everyone. In pursuit of this dream, local engineers, The Dingle Brothers were commissioned to construct the airfield on what was once Treswithick Farm. In 1972, the airfield was bought by the Cornwall Flying Club, which, in turn, became a limited company, Cornwall Flying Club Ltd, in 1978. In keeping with the original ideals and dreams of its creator, Cornwall Flying Club operates as a non-profit organisation, to keep costs down to the end user.

It was here that Trago Mills Ltd. (Aviation Division) designed and built the Trago Mills SAH-1 in the early 1980s. The SAH-1 derived its name from its designer, Sydney A. Holloway. It was hoped that the Trago Mills SAH-1 would be sold as a military trainer to replace the then ageing "Bulldog" fleet.

About 
Bodmin airfield is situated on the edge of Bodmin Moor, Cornwall, just off the main A30 dual carriageway. Bodmin airfield is operated by the Cornwall Flying Club and has a clubhouse, with lunchtime bar and restaurant. CFC Ltd have five instructors and four aircraft, including two Van's Aircraft RV-12, a Cessna 172 and a Cessna 152. The airfield is also home to Cornwall Aviation Services, an aircraft maintenance business.

References

External links

Airports in Cornwall